"Prince Andrew Is a Sweaty Nonce" is a 2022 punk rock single by The Kunts, a band created by the dark comedy singer Kunt and the Gang. The song is directed at Prince Andrew, Duke of York, and references his relationship with Jeffrey Epstein, who was convicted of child sex offences; the word "nonce" is British slang for a paedophile. The song reached No. 20 in the UK Singles Chart, and No. 1 in the UK Independent Singles Chart and UK Singles Sales Chart. The song is a follow-up to the band's previous tracks "Boris Johnson Is a Fucking Cunt" from 2020, and "Boris Johnson Is Still a Fucking Cunt" from 2021.

History
In May 2022, Kunt announced in a newsletter that The Kunts would release "Prince Andrew Is a Sweaty Nonce" on 27 May, to coincide with the charts at the time of the Platinum Jubilee of Elizabeth II on 3 June. As with the previous chart attempts, multiple versions of the song and 24-hour streams were released. Versions have been made by Ricardo Autobahn and Rob Manuel. The tracks were released by the band's independent Radical Rudeness label. In the newsletter, Kunt said that the song was: "our attempt for the Jubilee chart Number 2 (let's face it, even if we did sell enough they'd never let it be Number 1 anyway!)" This references the Sex Pistols song "God Save the Queen", which reached No. 2 in the UK Singles Chart during Elizabeth II's Silver Jubilee (1977), leading to claims that the song was deliberately kept off No. 1. In a press note, Kunt said the single was intended to reopen the conversation around Prince Andrew at a time the establishment wanted to hide it, and in particular Prince Andrew's relationships with Jeffrey Epstein and Virginia Giuffre.

The song's lyrics and promotion exploit the poorly received 2019 Newsnight interview in which Prince Andrew alleged an inability to sweat to refute one accusation and a trip to PizzaExpress in Woking as an alibi for another. It also refers to Andrew's out-of-court settlement of Giuffre's lawsuit, for an undisclosed amount reported at £12 million by some news sources.

The song features a satirical reworking of the nursery rhyme "The Grand Old Duke of York", which includes the following lyrics:
The grand old Duke of York
He said he didn't sweat
So why did he pay 12 million quid
To a girl he'd never met?

A video for the song was to be released on Kunt's YouTube channel on 20 May, but on 19 May the channel was taken down before he was able to post it. Within half-an-hour he appealed, but this was turned down. Kunt criticised the channel's removal saying it was "most unusual" for it to be taken down the day before the video's debut. He also said it was annoying that unlike "Boris Johnson Is a Fucking Cunt", which was not played on radio due to the swearing, "Prince Andrew Is a Sweaty Nonce" has no swearing, and the only explicit content is at the end when a man playing Prince Andrew has his naked buttocks censored by a PizzaExpress logo (though with the words "Pizza Express" replaced by "Sweaty Nonce"). He thus encouraged his followers to download the video from the song's website princeandrew.info and post it on as many YouTube channels as possible. 

The song peaked at No. 1 on the UK iTunes charts on 2 June 2022, with another version of the song peaking at #7 on the same day. The song also achieved #74 on the Worldwide iTunes charts. At 4:06 PM, the song achieved No. 1 on the Amazon Charts for Music. On 2 June 2022, the song reached #3 on the Trending Page of YouTube Music. Kunt attacked media outlets for not playing the song, complaining about being denied freedom of speech.

Promotion 

To promote the song, Kunt hosted a flash mob on 29 May at the Woking PizzaExpress. The band also put out a video of the "Randy Andy's Memory Loss Remix" via the website Chortle, which uses footage from the Newsnight interview. In the mid-week Singles Chart update on 30 May, "Prince Andrew Is a Sweaty Nonce" reached No. 36.

The song's cover image shows a drawing of a smiling and sweating Prince Andrew, underneath bunting made from Union Jack pennants, with one section replaced with a slice of pizza. The prince also holds a slice of pizza.

Reception
Before the song was released, Andy Malt at Complete Music Update compared the song to "God Save the Queen", saying that The Kunts make the Sex Pistols track "seem a bit twee".

On 31 May 2022, the Official Charts Twitter account announced it was one of the 'highest trending' songs in the UK.  In June 2022, at the Glastonbury Festival, graffiti of the words 'Prince Andrew Is a Sweaty Nonce' appeared. Kunt responded to the news saying that it was: "Nice to see the good folk at Glastonbury are ready to welcome Prince Andrew back into public life."

Personnel 

The performers on the track are:
Kunt – vocals
Carsehole – lead guitar
Rubber Johnny – bass guitar
Fucksticks – drums

Charts

References

External links
 

2022 singles
2022 songs
British monarchy
British punk rock songs
Cultural depictions of the British Royal Family
Jeffrey Epstein
Obscenity controversies in music
Prince Andrew, Duke of York
Protest songs
Republicanism in the United Kingdom
Satirical songs
Songs banned by the BBC
Songs based on children's songs
UK Independent Singles Chart number-one singles
Works about monarchy
Works based on nursery rhymes
YouTube controversies